Mimandria kely is a moth of the family Geometridae first described by Pierre Viette in 1971. It is found on Madagascar.

References

Moths described in 1971
Pseudoterpnini